Bhor is an Indian Hindi-language film directed by Kamakhya Narayan Singh and Produced by Anjani Kumar Singh. It stars Nalneesh Neel, Saveree Sri Gaur, Devesh Ranjan, Pavleen Gujral. The movie is streaming on MX Player.

Release 
The film was released on 5 February 2021 on MX Player.

Cast 
 Nalneesh Neel
 Saveree Sri Gaur
 Pavleen Gujral
 Devesh Ranjan
 Annukmpa Harsh
 Devendra Patel

Premiere 
International Film Festival of India, Goa 2018 (November)
Cairo International Film Festival, Cairo, Egypt 2019
Indian Film Festival of Melbourne, Australia
Indo-Germany Bollywood week
Bengaluru International Film Festival, Bengaluru.
Asian Film Festival, Pune 
Aurangabad International Film Festival 
Indian Panorama, Delhi 
Jharkhand International Film Festival, Ranchi
India Habitat International Film Festival, Delhi
Chalachitra, Guwahati
Jagran Film Festival, Patna
Jagran Film Festival, Ranchi
Jagran Film Festival, Mumbai
Azamgrah International Film Festival, Uttar Pradesh
Kalinga International Film Festival, Bhubneshwar
Raipur International Film Festival, Raipur,
Woodpecker International Film Festival, Delhi
Lonavla International Film Festival, Lonavla
Siliguri International Film Festival, Chennai,
India Panorama, Chennai
India  Panorama, Cochin

Awards 

 Won Best Director at Ottawa Indian Film Festival, Ottawa, Canada 2019
 Won Best Film Social Issue at Caleidoscope Indian Film Festival of Boston,  2020
Won Best Actor in Negative Role at Caleidoscope Indian Film Festival of Boston,  2020

References 

2021 films